Ealing Acton was a parliamentary constituency in West London, which returned one Member of Parliament (MP) to the House of Commons of the Parliament of the United Kingdom from 1983 until it was abolished for the 1997 general election.

History
This safe Conservative seat was held by Sir George Young (sometimes known as the 'Bicycling Baronet') for the entire period of its existence.

Boundaries
The London Borough of Ealing wards of Ealing Common, Hanger Lane, Heathfield, Pitshanger, Southfield, Springfield, Vale, and Victoria.

The constituency consisted of the eastern area of the London Borough of Ealing, in particular central Ealing and Acton. The boundary review implemented in 1997 meant that one seat was lost between the paired boroughs of Ealing and Hammersmith and Fulham. This resulted in the division of this seat. The majority of the constituents were placed into the new Ealing, Acton and Shepherd's Bush constituency.

Members of Parliament

Elections

Elections in the 1980s

Elections in the 1990s

See also
List of parliamentary constituencies in London

References

Parliamentary constituencies in London (historic)
Constituencies of the Parliament of the United Kingdom established in 1983
Constituencies of the Parliament of the United Kingdom disestablished in 1997
Politics of the London Borough of Ealing
Acton, London